Mark McGaw (born 17 May 1964) is an Australian former professional rugby league footballer who played in the 1980s and 1990s. Nicknamed Sparkles, he achieved national and state representative honors in the sport and following his retirement became one of the Gladiators in the Australian version of the TV show. McGaw is also the current coach of the North Sydney Bears SG Ball team for 2016.

Rugby league

McGaw played his club football for the Cronulla-Sutherland Sharks, Penrith Panthers and South Sydney Rabbitohs. Whilst guesting with English club Leeds he played for them against the 1986 Kangaroo tourists. The following season he played for the New South Wales Blues, appearing in all three games of the 1987 State of Origin series and scoring in Games I and III. McGaw played at centre for the Blues in all three matches of the 1988 State of Origin series as well. McGaw was selected to play at centre for Australia in their victory over New Zealand at the 1988 Rugby League World Cup Final in Auckland. He is listed on the Australian Players Register as Kangaroo No. 590.

McGaw played at centre for New South Wales in all 3 matches of the 1990 State of Origin series, scoring tries in Games I and III. At the end of the 1990 NSWRL season, he went on the 1990 Kangaroo tour of Great Britain and France. McGaw was selected to play for New South Wales in all three matches of the 1991 State of Origin series, scoring a try in Game II. At the end of the 1991 NSWRL season he was selected to go on the 1991 Kangaroo tour of Papua New Guinea. McGaw played for cross-town rivals Penrith Panthers for the 1993 NSWRL season. From 1994 to 1995 he played for the South Sydney Rabbitohs.

Career after Rugby league

McGaw appeared as "Hammer" on the Australian version of the TV show Gladiators from 1995 to 1996, as well as joining other rugby league players such as Paul Vautin, Paul Sironen and Darryl Brohman in modeling for Lowes Menswear.
McGaw is founder of  Mark McGaw Institute of Sports Science.

Defamation case
On 2 November 2006, the Supreme Court of New South Wales awarded McGaw $385,000 for a defamatory story Today Tonight broadcast in June 2003. The Supreme Court jury found that the story made two defamatory imputations: that McGaw was "a man of dangerous domestic violence", and that he "bashed his lover so severely that she was hospitalized with horrific injuries".

References

External links
Mark McGaw Institute of sports science 

1964 births
Living people
Australia national rugby league team players
Australian rugby league players
Cronulla-Sutherland Sharks players
Leeds Rhinos players
New South Wales City Origin rugby league team players
New South Wales Rugby League State of Origin players
Penrith Panthers players
Rugby league centres
Rugby league players from Sydney
South Sydney Rabbitohs players
Australian expatriate sportspeople in England